Roxby Downs may refer to.

Roxby Downs, South Australia, a town and a locality
Roxby Council, formerly Municipal Council of Roxby Downs, a local government area

See also
Roxby Downs Station